Martinez v. Ryan, 566 U.S. 1 (2012), was a United States Supreme Court case which considered whether criminal defendants ever have a right to the effective assistance of counsel in collateral state post-conviction proceedings. The Court held that a procedural default will not bar a federal habeas court from hearing ineffective-assistance-of-trial-counsel if there was no counsel or ineffective counsel in an initial-review collateral proceeding.

Background
Luis Mariano Martinez was accused of sexual misconduct with his eleven-year-old stepdaughter, who recanted her accusations. Martinez was convicted on two counts of sexual conduct with someone under the age of fifteen and was sentenced to two consecutive terms of thirty-five years to life. On direct appeal, the Arizona Court of Appeals affirmed the conviction. Martinez's first state-appointed appellate lawyer had filed a notice of post-conviction relief and, without notifying Martinez, had requested forty-five days for Martinez to file a pro se petition. Martinez obtained a second appellate lawyer who filed a new petition for post-conviction relief that alleged ineffective assistance on the part of Martinez's trial lawyer. The court claimed Martinez had defaulted on the claim by not raising it in his first post-conviction motion.

The Arizona Supreme Court denied review. Martinez then petitioned for a writ of habeas corpus, alleging that the right to effective assistance of counsel should extend to all collateral post-conviction relief proceedings in which a defendant has the first opportunity to raise a substantive challenge to his conviction. He argued that his court-appointed appellate attorney had failed to raise a claim in his first post-conviction proceeding that his lawyer at trial provided ineffective assistance. The United States District Court for the District of Arizona denied the petition, concluding that federal review was barred because the Arizona procedural rules were "adequate and independent."

Th District Court's decision was unanimously affirmed by the United States Court of Appeals for the Ninth Circuit which held that since there is no constitutional right to appointment of counsel during a defendant's post-conviction relief petition, there is no right to effective assistance of counsel. The court claimed that, although collateral proceedings might provide the first tier of review for a particular claim, Martinez had already benefitted from the assistance of counsel in a direct appeal. Martinez sought certiorari.

Supreme Court decision
On March 20, 2012, the Supreme Court issued a 7-2 decision written by Justice Anthony Kennedy, which created an exception to its 1991 holding in Coleman v. Thompson. Coleman v. Thompson held that attorney errors in post-conviction hearings do not qualify as cause to excuse procedural defaults. In the opinion for Martinez v. Ryan, the Court held that if state law requires ineffective-assistance-of-trial-counsel claims to be raised in an initial-review collateral proceeding, then a procedural default will not bar a federal habeas court from hearing those claims if there was no counsel or there was ineffective counsel in an initial-review collateral proceeding. Justice Kennedy wrote that "inadequate assistance of counsel at initial-review collateral proceedings may establish cause for a prisoner's procedural default of a claim of ineffective assistance at trial." The judgement of the Court of Appeals was reversed and remanded.

Dissent
Justice Antonin Scalia dissented and was joined by Justice Clarence Thomas. Scalia claimed that the majority opinion created a constitutional right to effective counsel in all collateral hearings.

Reactions
Following the decision, the American Bar Association, which had submitted an amicus brief in the case, stated "this welcome decision is in accord with longstanding policy of the American Bar Association" and claimed that this "significant ruling will help ensure fairness and justice for many criminal defendants throughout the country."

See also
 Shinn v. Ramirez

References

United States Supreme Court cases
United States Supreme Court cases of the Roberts Court